Farm to Market Roads in Texas are owned and maintained by the Texas Department of Transportation (TxDOT).

RM 1900

Ranch to Market Road 1900 (RM 1900) is located in Mason County. It runs from SH 29 east of Art to RM 2618.

On March 5, 1976, the road was extended north  to RM 2618.

FM 1900 (1951)

FM 1900 (1956)

FM 1900 was designated on December 13, 1956, from the Boulevard at Pleasure Island in Port Arthur south to a point near Sabine Pass. This route, the main levee south of Port Arthur, was formerly SH 362. FM 1900 was cancelled upon completion of construction on October 30, 1958, and turned over to the city of Port Arthur (though it was open and signed on October 27, 1958). The route became SH 82 in 1975.

FM 1901

Farm to Market Road 1901 (FM 1901) is located in Pecos, Crockett, and Upton counties.

The road passes through Bakersfield Valley before crossing the Pecos River into Crockett County. The road traverses the northwest corner of Crockett County for approximately  where the road turns to the north.

FM 1901 was designated on December 18, 1951, from FM 305 south of McCamey south to the Pecos County line; the same day, it was extended to FM 11. The extension was reverted on February 15, 1952, but was ultimately restored.

FM 1902

Farm to Market Road 1902 (FM 1902) is located in Tarrant and Johnson counties.

FM 1902 begins at a signaled-controlled intersection with FM 917 west of Joshua. The highway travels in a northern direction through suburban areas, passing by R.C. Loflin Middle and Caddo Grove Elementary schools. FM 1902 turns northwest near an intersection with County Road 913, then crosses under the Chisholm Trail Parkway (CTP) toll road without any access between the two. The highway turns in a slight northeast direction at County Road 915, then has an interchange with the CTP. FM 1902 turns back into a more northward direction near County Road 1015 and enters Tarrant County near Floyd Hampton Road. The highway travels through more rural areas before ending at an intersection with FM 1187 west of Crowley.

The current FM 1902 was designated in 1955 from FM 917 to FM 1187, replacing part of FM 731.

FM 1902 (1951)

The original FM 1902 was designated on November 20, 1951, from US 75 (now SH 75) at Crabbs Prairie west  to a road intersection. FM 1902 was cancelled on May 18, 1955, and became a portion of FM 1696.

FM 1903

Farm to Market Road 1903 (FM 1903) is located in Hunt County. It runs from SH 34 south of Greenville to FM 36 southeast of Caddo Mills.

FM 1903 was designated on December 18, 1951, from SH 34, 6 miles south of Greenville, west  to a road intersection. On August 20, 1952, the road was extended west  to FM 36.

FM 1904

Farm to Market Road 1904 (FM 1904) is located in Coke County. Much of the route lies close to the eastern shore of the E.V. Spence Reservoir.

A section of the route was formerly FM 387, which was decommissioned in Coke County in 1969.

FM 1904 (1951)

FM 1904 was originally designated on November 20, 1951. It was located in Webb and Jim Hogg counties, running from US 59 (now SH 359) south  via Mirando City to the Jim Hogg County line. On August 26, 1953, the road was extended south  to FM 496 (now SH 16) near Randado. FM 1904 was cancelled on August 5, 1954, and became a portion of FM 649.

FM 1904 (1958)

A second route numbered FM 1904 was designated on October 31, 1958. Located in Bailey County, it ran from FM 746, 8 miles east of the Texas–New Mexico state line, south to FM 298. FM 1904 was cancelled on September 19, 1968, and became a portion of FM 1731.

FM 1905

FM 1906

Farm to Market Road 1906 (FM 1906) is located in Wheeler County. It runs from US 83 south of Wheeler to FM 592 south of Kelton.

FM 1906 was designated on November 30, 1954, on the current route.

FM 1906 (1951)

The original FM 1906 was designated on November 20, 1951, from US 83 in north Uvalde northeast to US 90, 5.2 miles east of Uvalde. FM 1906 was cancelled on June 30, 1954, and removed from the highway system by the request of the Uvalde County Commissioner's Court. The route was revived as an extension of FM 2369 in 1958.

FM 1907

Farm to Market Road 1907 (FM 1907) is located in Maverick County. It runs from US 277 north of Eagle Pass to the entrance of the Maverick County Hydroelectric Power Plant.

FM 1907 was designated on November 20, 1951, on the current route.

FM 1908

Farm to Market Road FM 1908 (FM FM 1908) is located in Maverick and Kinney counties. It runs from US 277 northwest of Normandy to SH 131 south of Spofford.

On December 17, 1952, the road was extended north  to the Kinney County line. On September 29, 1954, the road was extended northeast  to SH 131. On October 19, 1956, the road was extended  to US 277, replacing portions of FM 1590 and FM 1591.

FM 1909

Farm to Market Road 1909 (FM 1909) is located in Liberty County. It runs from FM 160 to US 90.

FM 1909 was designated on February 17, 1971, on the current route.

FM 1909 (1951)

The original FM 1909 was designated on November 20, 1951, from US 190 (now SH 156), 2 miles south of Point Blank, northeast  to Patrick's Ferry Community. FM 1909 was cancelled on March 31, 1970: a 1.4 mile section from new US 190 south to Lake Livingston was transferred to FM 980 and the remaining 2.1 miles were removed altogether due to inundation and rerouting of US 190.

FM 1910

Farm to Market Road 1910 (FM 1910) is located in Cherokee County. It runs from FM 347 in Dialville to FM 2138 near Union Grove Church.

FM 1910 was designated on November 20, 1951, from FM 347 at Dialville west  to a road intersection. On August 24, 1955, a  section from Union Grove Church north to FM 347 near Jacksonville was added. Three months later this section was transferred to FM 2138.

FM 1911

Farm to Market Road 1911 (FM 1911) is located in Cherokee County. It runs from US 69 south of Alto to a point near the Angelina River.

FM 1911 was designated on November 20, 1951, from US 69 south of Alto south  to Brunswick. On October 26, 1954, the road was extended south  to Spur 29 in Forest. On June 13, 1958, the road was extended to US 69 northwest of Wells, replacing Spur 29 (although signage did not change until 1959). On June 2, 1967, the road was extended northeast  from US 69, and extended northeast another  to a point near the Angelina River on September 29, 1977.

FM 1912

Farm to Market Road 1912 (FM 1912) is located in Potter County.

FM 1912 begins at an intersection with US 287 southeast of Amarillo. The highway travels in a northern direction and travels through Amarillo between FM 2575 and US 60 / BL I-40. FM 1912 turns west at St. Francis Avenue and continues to run in a western direction before ending at Loop 335.

The highway was extended  northward and westward to Loop 335 on January 29, 1974. On June 14, 1991, the section of highway south of US 287 was decommissioned. The section of highway between US 60 and US 287 was redesignated Urban Road 1912 (UR 1912) on June 27, 1995. The designation reverted to FM 1912 with the elimination of the Urban Road system on November 15, 2018.

Junction list

FM 1913

Farm to Market Road 1913 (FM 1913) is located in Moore County. It runs from US 87 and SH 354 at Four Way to SH 152.

FM 1913 was designated on November 20, 1951, from US 87 and SH 354 at Four Way east  to the Canadian River Gas Company Plant.

FM 1914

Farm to Market Road 1914 (FM 1914) is located in Hale County. It runs from FM 179 to FM 400 south of Plainview. There is a brief concurrency with I-27.

FM 1914 was designated on November 20, 1951, from FM 594 (now FM 179) east to FM 1424 at Hale Center. On May 21, 1953, the road was extended east  to US 87 (now I-27). On October 26, 1954, the road was extended east  to FM 400, creating a concurrency with US 87.

FM 1915

Farm to Market Road 1915 (FM 1915) is located in Milam County. It runs from FM 485 at Yarrelton to FM 437 near Davilla. There is a concurrency with US 190 in Buckholts.

FM 1915 was designated on October 3, 1968, from FM 485 at Yarrelton south to US 190 at Buckholts, then from a point on US 190 at Buckholts south to a road intersection at Corinth as a replacement of a section of FM 485. On November 26, 1969, the road was extended south  to a point 0.3 miles south of Little River Slough. On September 29, 1977, the road was extended southwest . On April 25, 1978, the road was extended  miles to FM 1328. On May 30, 1978, the road was extended  to FM 437 near Davilla, replacing FM 1328.

FM 1915 (1951)

The first use of the FM 1915 designation was in Freestone County, from US 75 (now SH 75) at Dew west to the southern terminus of FM 1451 at Luna. On October 26, 1954, a section from FM 80 south of Freestone northeast to FM 1451 at Luna was added. FM 1915 was cancelled on May 31, 1955, and became a portion of FM 489.

FM 1915 (1958)

The next use of the FM 1915 designation was in Harrison and Marion counties, from FM 134/SH 43 at or near Karnack north across Cypress Bayou to an intersection with FM 805 in Marion County, then onward to an intersection with SH 49 at or near its junction with SH 43. FM 1915 was cancelled on June 1, 1967, and re-designated SH 43.

FM 1916

Farm to Market Road 1916 (FM 1916) is located in Dimmit County. It runs from FM 190 (former US 83) north of Asherton to a point 3 miles southwest.

FM 1916 was designated on November 20, 1951, on the current route.

FM 1917

Farm to Market Road 1917 (FM 1917) is located in Dimmit County. It runs from SH 85 near the east side of Carrizo Springs to FM 1557.

FM 1917 was designated on November 20, 1951, from FM 1557 north and east to US 83, 3.5 miles south of Carrizo Springs. On February 24, 1953, the road was rerouted and extended  to US 83 near Carrizo Springs.

FM 1918

Farm to Market Road 1918 (FM 1918) is located in Dimmit County. It runs from FM 191 to FM 1407.

FM 1918 was designated on November 20, 1951, from US 83, 7 miles north of Carrizo Springs, west and north to FM 191. On September 13, 1955, a  section from the junction of then-present FM 1918 and FM 1407 east to US 83 was transferred to FM 1407.

RM 1919

Ranch to Market Road 1919 (RM 1919) is located in Foard and Baylor counties.

RM 1919 begins at an intersection with US 82 near Seymour. The highway travels in a northern direction and passes near Seymour Municipal Airport at an intersection with FM 2069. RM 1919 turns in a northwest direction at FM 2582. In Foard County, the highway generally runs parallel to the North Wichita River, ending at an intersection with FM 267.

The highway was rerouted to end at US 82 / US 277 near Seymour on January 14, 1957, absorbing part of FM 1153 and all of FM 1604 in the process. On June 27, 1963, a 10.9 mile section from at or near Crowell to FM 267 was removed from the highway system in exchange for designation of FM 2877. A spur segment was created near Seymour on March 28, 2002, from a former section of FM 1153.

Junction list

FM 1919 (1951)

The first use of the FM 1919 designation was in Gregg County, from SH 26 southwest of Longview southeast to SH 149. FM 1919 was cancelled on July 28, 1953, and transferred to FM 1845 (now Loop 281).

FM 1919 (1953)

The next use of the FM 1919 designation was in La Salle County, from SH 97 at Los Angeles to a point 9.8 miles south and west as a replacement of a section of FM 468. FM 1919 was cancelled on October 27, 1954, and became a portion of FM 469.

FM 1920

Farm to Market Road 1920 (FM 1920) is located in Hemphill and Lipscomb counties. It runs from US 60 northeast of Canadian to SH 305 south of Lipscomb.

FM 1920 was designated on December 18, 1951, from US 60, 5 miles north of Canadian, north  to a point 1 mile north of Locust Grove School. On September 27, 1960, the road was extended north . On November 22, 1960, the road was extended north and east , and to SH 305, 2 miles south of Lipscomb on December 5 of that year, replacing FM 2588.

FM 1921

Farm to Market Road 1921 (FM 1921) is located in Willacy and Hidalgo counties. It runs from Business US 77 north of Lyford to FM 1015.

On May 5, 1966, the road was extended west  to FM 1015.

FM 1922

Farm to Market Road 1922 (FM 1922) is located in Wilson County. It runs from SH 97 northeast of Floresville to FM 537.

FM 1922 was designated on December 18, 1951, from SH 97, 8 miles northeast of Floresville, southeast  to a road intersection. On October 13, 1954, the road was extended southeast  to FM 537.

FM 1923

Farm to Market Road 1923 (FM 1923) is located in Hutchinson County. It runs from FM 1598 to SH 152 west of Stinnett.

FM 1923 was designated on December 18, 1951, from SH 152 west of Stinnett north  to a road intersection. On February 21, 1952, the road was extended north  to FM 1598.

FM 1924

Farm to Market Road 1924 (FM 1924) is located in Hidalgo County. It runs from FM 492 to FM 1926.

FM 1924 was designated on November 20, 1951, from FM 492, 3.1 miles north of US 83, east  to SH 107. On September 21, 1955, the road was extended east  to FM 494. On July 11, 1968, the road was extended east  to FM 1926. On June 27, 1995, the entire route was transferred to UR 1924, but was changed back to FM 1924 on November 15, 2018.

FM 1925

Farm to Market Road 1925 (FM 1925) is located in Hidalgo County. It runs from FM 681 to FM 491. The road is known locally as Monte Cristo Road.

FM 1925 was designated on November 20, 1951, from US 281 (later Loop 113, now Business US 281), 1.5 miles north of Edinburg, east  to a road intersection. On December 17, 1952, the road was extended east  to FM 88. On September 21, 1955, the road was extended west  to FM 681 and east to FM 491, creating a concurrency with FM 1015. On June 27, 1995, the section from UR 2220 to UR 907 was transferred to UR 1925, but was changed back to FM 1925 on November 15, 2018.

FM 1926

Farm to Market Road 1926 (FM 1926) is located in Hidalgo County. It runs from SH 107 to Business US 83. The road is known locally as N 23rd Street.

FM 1926 was designated on November 20, 1951, from US 83 (later Loop 374, now Business US 83) south  to Spur 241 with a concurrency with FM 1016. This currency was removed on June 10, 1952, when that section of FM 1016 was transferred to FM 1926. On April 20, 1954, the road was extended north  to FM 495 (now SH 495). On June 28, 1963, the road was extended north  to the northern city limit of McAllen and a break was added at FM 495 (it was removed on November 16, 1965). On May 6, 1964, the road was extended north  to SH 107. On June 4, 1970, the section from Loop 374 to Spur 241 was redesignated as Spur 115. On June 27, 1995, the entire route was transferred to UR 1926, but was changed back to FM 1926 on November 15, 2018.

FM 1927

Farm to Market Road 1927 (FM 1927) is located in Ward County. It runs from I-20 at Pyote to FM 1776.

On May 24, 1968, a section from the junction with FM 3114 to a point 1.716 miles south was removed from the highway system due to completion of FM 3114. FM 1927 was instead extended southeast to FM 1776 three days later, replacing FM 3114.

FM 1928

Farm to Market Road 1928 (FM 1928) was located in Lamb County. No highway currently uses the FM 1928 designation.

FM 1928 was designated on May 23, 1951, from FM 54, 0.2 mile east of the Bailey County line, north and east  to FM 303. On December 3, 1953, the road was extended east  to US 84. FM 1928 was cancelled on September 19, 1968, and became a portion of FM 37.

FM 1929

Farm to Market Road 1929 (FM 1929) is located in Tom Green, Concho, and Coleman counties. It runs from FM 1692 to FM 503.

FM 1929 was designated on December 17, 1952, from FM 381, 1 mile east of Lowake, east  to US 83. On September 20, 1961, the road was extended west  to FM 1692, creating a concurrency with FM 381. On November 29, 1988, a  section from a point east of Concho to FM 503 was added.

FM 1929 (1951)

The original FM 1929 was designated on December 18, 1951, from US 287 at Goodnight north   to the Salt Fork of the Red River. FM 1929 was cancelled on December 17, 1952, and transferred to FM 294.

FM 1930

Farm to Market Road 1930 (FM 1930) is located in Jim Wells County. It runs from US 281 south of Alice to FM 665 (former FM 736) east of Alice.

FM 1930 was designated on December 18, 1951, on the current route.

FM 1931

Farm to Market Road 1931 (FM 1931) is located in Jim Wells County. It runs from SH 44/SH 359 on the east side of Alice to FM 665. The road is known locally as Flournoy Road.

FM 1931 was designated on December 18, 1951, from US 59 (now SH 359), 2 miles east of Alice, to Alice Airport. On December 17, 1952, the road was extended southeast  to FM 736 (now FM 665). On October 21, 1981, a  section was returned to Jim Wells County when FM 1931 was rerouted.

FM 1932

Farm to Market Road 1932 (FM 1932) is located in Donley County. It runs from SH 203 in Hedley to FM 2471.

FM 1932 was designated on December 18, 1951, on the current route.

FM 1933

Farm to Market Road 1933 (FM 1933) is located in Loving County. The entire route travels within the town of Mentone.

FM 1933 begins at an intersection with SH 302 at Pecos Street. The highway runs in a northwest direction along North Pecos Street for two blocks before turning northeast onto West Wheat Street. FM 1933 runs along West Wheat Street for a block, then turns southeast onto North Dallas Street, traveling for two blocks before ending back at an intersection with SH 302.

FM 1933 was designated in 1951 along its current route.

FM 1934

Farm to Market Road 1934 (FM 1934) is located in Reeves County. It runs from FM 869 to SH 17 southwest of Pecos.

FM 1934 was designated on December 18, 1951, on the current route.

FM 1935

Farm to Market Road 1935 (FM 1935) is located in Washington County. It runs from FM 390 near William Penn to Bluff Community.

FM 1935 was designated on October 21, 1959, on the current route.

FM 1935 (1951)

The first use of the FM 1935 designation was in Hardin County, from FM 770 at Batson west  to the Liberty County line. FM 1935 was cancelled on December 17, 1952, and transferred to FM 162 (now SH 105).

FM 1935 (1952)

The next use of the FM 1935 designation was in Montague County, from SH 59 in Bowie north  to a road intersection. On October 31, 1958, the road was extended north to FM 1806. FM 1935 was cancelled on February 2, 1959, and transferred to FM 1816.

FM 1936

Farm to Market Road 1936 (FM 1936) is located in Ector County. It runs from SH 158 at Smith Chapel to I-20.

FM 1936 was designated on December 18, 1951, from SH 158 at Smith Chapel south to US 80 (now I-20), 2 miles west of Odessa. On November 5, 1971, the road was extended southeast  from US 80, but this extension was cancelled on July 31, 1975, as the county could not acquire right-of-way for it. On June 27, 1995, the section from SH 302 to I-20 was transferred to UR 1936, but was changed back to FM 1936 on November 15, 2018.

FM 1937

Farm to Market Road 1937 (FM 1937) is located in Bexar County. It runs from US 281 south of San Antonio southeast to Loop 1604.

FM 1937 was designated on October 13, 1954, from US 281 south of San Antonio south to Losoya. On November 21, 1956, the road was extended northeast  to US 87 near Rock Springs School. On August 8, 1958, a 21.5 mile section from Losoya east and northeast to US 87 was transferred to FM 1518 (now Loop 1604). On December 12, 1979, a spur connection in Losoya to Loop 1604 was added, replacing a former routing of Loop 1604. On December 30, 1988, the spur connection was redesignated as FM 3499.

FM 1937 (1951)

The original FM 1937 was designated on December 18, 1951, from US 84 in Farwell south and west  to the Texas/New Mexico state line. FM 1937 was cancelled on May 25, 1954, and eliminated from the highway system.

FM 1938

Farm to Market Road 1938 (FM 1938) is located in Tarrant County. It runs from FM 1709 to SH 121.

FM 1938 was designated on August 24, 1955, on the current route. On June 27, 1995, FM 1938 was transferred to UR 1938, but was changed back to FM 1938 on November 15, 2018.

FM 1938 (1952)

The original FM 1938 was designated on January 18, 1952, from FM 1490 at Oklahoma Flat west  to what is now FM 303. FM 1938 was cancelled on November 1, 1954, and became a portion of FM 597.

FM 1939

Farm to Market Road 1939 (FM 1939) is located in Yoakum County. It runs from SH 214 north of Denver City to FM 1780.

FM 1939 was designated on January 18, 1952, from SH 214, 1 mile north of Denver City, east and south  to the Gaines County line. On September 15, 1976, the section from FM 1544 to SH 83 (as well as FM 1544 itself) was transferred to FM 1780.

FM 1940

Farm to Market Road 1940 (FM 1940) is located in Robertson County. It runs from US 79 at New Baden to SH OSR.

FM 1941 was designated on January 18, 1952, from US 79 at New Baden southeast  to a road intersection. Five months later the road was extended southeast  to another road intersection. On October 31, 1958, the road was extended southeast  to SH OSR. On September 5, 1973, a section from SH OSR to FM 974 was added, but was cancelled on January 22, 1976, by request of the Brazos County Court.

FM 1941

Farm to Market Road 1941 (FM 1941) is located in Chambers County. It runs from SH 65 to SH 124 at Sea Breeze.

On December 17, 1952, the road was extended west and south  to SH 73-T (now SH 65).

FM 1942

Farm to Market Road 1942 (FM 1942) is located in Harris and Chambers counties. It runs from US 90 and FM 2100 at Barrett south and east to SH 146 at Mont Belvieu.

FM 1942 was designated on November 20, 1951, from SH 146 at Mont Belvieu west  to the Harris County line. On October 31, 1958, the road was extended west  to a county road. On November 24, 1959, the western terminus was relocated to Crosby/Lynchburg Road. On May 7, 1970, the road was extended north  to US 90.

FM 1943

Farm to Market Road 1943 (FM 1943) is located in Tyler County. It runs from FM 92 near Mount Olive Church to intersection of CR 1700 and CR 1705.

On December 17, 1952, the road was extended east  to a road intersection. Six months later the road was extended east and southeast . On November 21, 1956, the road was extended southeast  to FM 92.

FM 1944

Farm to Market Road 1944 (FM 1944) is located in San Patricio County. It runs from US 77 northeast of Odem to FM 631 southwest of Taft.

FM 1944 was designated on November 20, 1951, on the current route.

FM 1945

Farm to Market Road 1945 (FM 1945) is located in San Patricio County. It runs from US 77 southwest of Sinton to CR 2015.

FM 1945 was designated on November 20, 1951, on the current route.

FM 1946

Farm to Market Road 1946 (FM 1946) is located in Hill and Navarro counties. It runs from SH 171 in Bynum to FM 744.

On April 22, 1958, the road was extended west , replacing Spur 192. On June 2, 1967, the road was extended southeast  to the Navarro County line. On July 31, 1996, a  section (the former Spur 192) from SH 171 to CR 256 was removed and returned to Bynum.

FM 1947

Farm to Market Road 1947 (FM 1947) is located in Hill County. It runs from SH 22 at Peoria to FM 310 at Vaughan with a spur connection to Aquilla Lake.

FM 1947 was designated on January 18, 1952, on the current route; the spur was added on February 10, 1980.

FM 1948

Farm to Market Road 1948 (FM 1948) is located in Washington County. It runs from SH 36 south of Yegua Creek to US 290 west of Brenham.

FM 1948 was designated on August 24, 1955, from US 290, 9 miles west of Brenham, northwest to FM 390, 2.5 miles northeast of Burton. On November 26, 1969, the road was extended north and east . On December 19 of that year the road was extended  to SH 36, replacing FM 3092.

FM 1948 (1952)

The original FM 1948 was designated on January 18, 1952, from SH 171 at Oceola, southwest  to a road intersection. On December 17 of that year the road was extended southwest  to FM 933. FM 1948 was cancelled on February 15, 1955, and became a portion of FM 934.

FM 1949

Farm to Market Road 1949 (FM 1949) is located in Wilbarger County. It runs from US 70/US 287 to FM 433.

FM 1949 was designated on August 24, 1955, from US 287 at Paradise Creek to a county road (now FM 433). On June 2, 1967, the road was extended north  from US 183 (former US 287) to US 287 and a break was added at Loop 488 (now Business US 287).

FM 1949 (1951)

The original FM 1949 was designated on November 20, 1951, from SH 7 at Ratcliff northwest  to Tadmor. On December 17, 1952, the road was extended northwest  to a road intersection. FM 1949 was cancelled on November 15, 1954, and became a portion of FM 227.

FM 1950

Farm to Market Road 1950 (FM 1950) is located in Falls County. It runs from FM 1239 to US 77 west of Chilton.

FM 1950 was designated on November 20, 1951, from FM 1239 northeast via Sego to US 77 (later FM 107, now Business SH 7) in Chilton. On April 29, 1959, a  section from new US 77 west of Chilton to old US 77 in Chilton was removed from the highway system due to rerouting of US 77 and SH 7. This section is now CR 4023.

FM 1951

Farm to Market Road 1951 (FM 1951) is located in Limestone County. It runs from SH 171 in Coolidge to the intersection of LCR 205 and LCR 198.
 
FM 1951 was designated on January 18, 1952, from SH 171 in Coolidge to Datura. On October 3, 1966, the road was extended north 0.13 mile to new SH 171.

FM 1952

Farm to Market Road 1952 (FM 1952) is located in Austin and Fort Bend counties. It runs from SH 36 at Wallis to US 90A at Tavener.

FM 1952 was designated on April 24, 1953, from SH 36 at Wallis  to the Fort Bend County line.

FM 1952 (1952)

The original FM 1952 was designated on January 18, 1952, from FM 39, 1 mile southeast of Farrar, south  to the Leon County line. FM 1952 was cancelled on April 7, 1953, and transferred to FM 1512.

FM 1953

Farm to Market Road 1953 (FM 1953) is located in Limestone County. It runs from FM 39 at Fallon to SH 164.

FM 1953 was designated on January 18, 1952, from SH 164 near Center  to Prairie Grove. On January 23, 1953, the road was extended  miles north to FM 39.

FM 1954

FM 1955

FM 1955 (1952)

The original FM 1955 was designated on February 20, 1952, from SH 25  to Lake Kickapoo Dam. FM 1955 was cancelled on February 6, 1953, and transferred to FM 368.

FM 1956

Farm to Market Road 1956 (FM 1956) is located in Montague County. FM 1956 also intersects FM 3301 and FM 1815.

FM 1956 was designated on August 24, 1955, from FM 103 east . On October 31, 1957, it was extended east to FM 1815. On October 31, 1958, the route was extended to its current eastern terminus.

FM 1956 (1951)

FM 1956 was cancelled on October 18, 1954, and became a portion of FM 290 (now SH 214).

FM 1957

Farm to Market Road 1957 (FM 1957) is located in Medina and Bexar counties. The  highway serves as an arterial street through the growing western suburbs of San Antonio. FM 1957 is known as Potranco Road within Bexar County.

FM 1957 was designated on October 13, 1954, from FM 471 southeast and southwest  to the Bexar-Medina county line. On November 21, 1956, a  spur connection to Loop 13 was added. On October 31, 1957, FM 1957 was extended west  to FM 471 near Rio Medina. On December 30, 1988, the segment of Culebra Road between Grissom Road (FM 471) and I-410 was transferred to FM 3487 (which was decommissioned in 2014 as part of TxDOT's San Antonio turnback plan). On June 27, 1995, the section from Loop 1604 to UR 3487 was transferred to Urban Road 1957 (UR 1957). The designation of this section reverted to FM 1957 with the elimination of the Urban Road system on November 15, 2018. The section of FM 1957 east of Loop 1604 was proposed for decommissioning in 2014 as part of TxDOT's San Antonio turnback proposal, which would have turned back over 129 miles of roads to the city of San Antonio, but the city of San Antonio rejected that proposal.

FM 1957 (1951)

The original FM 1957 was designated on November 20, 1951, from US 180 east of Gail, south  to Union School. FM 1957 was canceled on September 30, 1954, and became a portion of FM 1610.

FM 1958

FM 1958 (1951)

The original FM 1958 was designated on November 20, 1951, from US 180 east of Gail north and east  to the Borden/Scurry County line near Fluvanna. FM 1958 was cancelled on January 27, 1953, and transferred to FM 612.

FM 1959

Farm to Market Road 1959 (FM 1959) is located in southeast Harris County within the Houston–Sugar Land–Baytown metropolitan area. It runs from I-45 to the entrance to Ellington Field on SH 3 to the northeast.

FM 1959 was designated on March 28, 1952, to run from US 75 (now SH 3) to Ellington Field, on its current alignment. The route was redesignated Urban Road 1959 (UR 1959) in 1995. The designation reverted to FM 1959 with the elimination of the Urban Road system on November 15, 2018.

FM 1960

Farm to Market Road 1960 (FM 1960) is located in Harris and Liberty counties. It runs from US 290 near Satsuma to SH 321 in Dayton.

FM 1960 was designated on May 23, 1951, from US 290 near Satsuma northeast  to Kuykendahl Road at Bammel. On September 29, 1954, a  section from US 90 near Katy northeast to Satsuma was added. On September 15, 1955, the southwestern terminus was relocated to US 90 at Addicks. On November 1, 1968, a  section from US 59 to US 290 was transferred to SH 6. On November 20, 1985, a  section from old US 290 north to new US 290 was also transferred to SH 6. On June 30, 1995, the section from US 290 to FM 2100 was redesignated Urban Road 1960 (UR 1960). The designation of this section reverted to FM 1960 with the elimination of the Urban Road system on November 15, 2018.

FM 1961

FM 1962

Farm to Market Road 1962 (FM 1962) is located in McMullen County. It runs from SH 16 to CR 144.

On May 25, 1976, the route was changed to FM 1962 and extended southeast .

FM 1962 (1952)

On August 24, 1955, FM 1962 was cancelled and transferred to FM 864 (now RM 864).

FM 1963

RM 1964

Ranch to Market Road 1964 (RM 1964) is located in Crockett County. It runs from SH 137 (former FM 865/RM 865) to Todd Oil Field near the intersection of CR 301 and CR 302.

RM 1964 was designated on September 25, 1952, on the current route as FM 1964 and was changed to RM 1964 on November 13, 1959.

FM 1965

FM 1965 (1952)

The original FM 1965 was designated on October 21, 1952, from SH 87 in Hemphill east  to a road intersection. FM 1965 was cancelled on May 15, 1961, and transferred to FM 83.

FM 1966

FM 1967

FM 1968

FM 1969

FM 1970

FM 1971

FM 1972

Farm to Market Road 1972 (FM 1972) is located in Upshur County. It runs from FM 1649 to FM 726.

FM 1972 was designated on December 17, 1952, from FM 1649 to SH 26 (now US 259) at Old Diana. On September 18, 1962, a 0.5 mile section from a then-junction with FM 1973 to SH 26 was transferred to FM 1973 (now FM 726).

RM 1973

FM 1973

FM 1973 was designated on December 17, 1952, from FM 1650 northeast to SH 154. On October 29, 1953, the road was extended south  to FM 1403 (now SH 300) at Glenwood, creating a concurrency with FM 1650. On December 3, 1957, the road was extended southwest to US 271 and northeast to FM 1972, creating a concurrency with SH 154. On September 18, 1962, the road was extended east  to SH 26, replacing a section of FM 1972. FM 1973 was cancelled on June 28, 1963, and transferred to FM 726.

FM 1974

FM 1974 (1952)

The original FM 1974 was designated on December 17, 1952, from FM 513 east to the Rains County line. At , this FM 1974 was one of the shortest Farm to Market Roads. On October 26, 1954, the road was extended south  to FM 2102. FM 1974 was cancelled on November 29, 1954, and became a portion of FM 513; at the same time, FM 2102 was cancelled and became a portion of FM 35.

FM 1975

FM 1976

Farm to Market Road 1976 (FM 1976) is located in Bexar County.

FM 1976 begins at a junction with I-35 / I-410 near Windcrest. The highway travels in an eastern direction along Walzem Road along the southern boundary of Windcrest, then turns south at an intersection with Eagle Crest Boulevard and Montgomery Drive, before turning southeast at Eisenhaur Road and Woodlake Parkway. FM 1976 turns northeast at Gibbs Sprawl Road, then travels through Converse, intersecting FM 1516. The highway enters Universal City, where it ends at a junction with Loop 1604.

The highway was extended  eastward to FM 78 near Converse on December 2, 1953. FM 1976 was extended  eastward on March 24, 1963, in FM 78 was re-routed. The highway was rerouted to Loop 1604 on May 22, 1979, replacing FM 3375, while the old route was designated as a spur of FM 1976. On December 20, 1988, the spur was redesignated as FM 3502, which has since been decommissioned. On June 27, 1995, the route was redesignated Urban Road 1976 (UR 1976). The designation reverted to FM 1976 with the elimination of the Urban Road system on November 15, 2018.

FM 1977

FM 1978

FM 1979

FM 1980

FM 1980 (1952)

The first use of the FM 1980 designation was in Bexar County, from FM 1516 near Martinez east  to a road intersection. On October 28, 1953, the road was extended west  to Loop 13. FM 1980 was cancelled on October 27, 1954, and became a portion of FM 1346.

FM 1980 (1955)

The second use of the FM 1980 designation was in Freestone County, from US 84, 2 miles northwest of Butler south  to near Keechi Creek. On November 21, 1956, the road was extended  to FM 489 at Lanely. FM 1980 was cancelled on December 10, 1956, and transferred to FM 489.

RM 1980 (1957)

The third use of the FM 1980 designation was in Crockett and Pecos counties as RM 1980, from RM 33 (now SH 137) west  to the Pecos River. On September 27, 1960, the road was extended west  to SH 349 at Iraan. By 1966, the road was signed, but not designated, as part of SH 29. FM 1980 was cancelled on June 30, 1977, and re-designated as US 190.

FM 1981

FM 1981 (1952)

The original FM 1981 was designated on December 17, 1952, from FM 621 (now FM 20), 3 miles southeast of Staples, northeast to the San Marcos River. FM 1981 was cancelled on October 21, 1954, and became a portion of FM 964 (now FM 20).

FM 1982

FM 1983

FM 1984

FM 1985

FM 1985 (1952)

The original FM 1985 was designated on December 17, 1952, from US 290 in Giddings northeast  towards Dime Box. Ten months later FM 1985 was cancelled and transferred to FM 141.

FM 1986

FM 1986 (1952)

FM 1986 was cancelled on September 30, 1954, and became a portion of FM 1228.

FM 1986 (1954)

The next use of the FM 1986 designation was in Briscoe County, from SH 256, 7 miles east of SH 86, south to the Haynes Boy Scout camp. FM 1986 was cancelled on January 19, 1956, and returned to Briscoe County. This was revived on March 21, 1963, as FM 2167 (but that was cancelled on October 27, 1994, as TxDOT could no longer maintain the road).

FM 1986 (1956)

FM 1986 was cancelled and removed from the highway system ten months later in lieu of designation of RM 1319.

FM 1987

FM 1988

RM 1989

FM 1989 (1952)

Farm to Market Road 1989 (FM 1989) was designated on December 17, 1952, from FM 860 near Blackfoot, northward and eastward  to SH 19 at Bradford. FM 1989 was cancelled two months later and became a portion of FM 837.

FM 1990

Farm to Market Road 1990 (FM 1990) is located in Anderson County. It runs from US 79/US 84 southwest of Palestine to SH 294 with a spur connection to Old Fort Houston.

FM 1990 was designated on December 17, 1952, on the current route; the spur connection was formerly a portion of Spur 89.

FM 1991

FM 1992

Farm to Market Road 1992 (FM 1992) is located in San Augustine County. It runs from SH 147 near Macune, west and south to SH 103.

On June 2, 1967, it was extended to SH 103, replacing FM 2786.

FM 1992 (1952)

A previous route numbered FM 1992 was designated on December 17, 1952, from former SH 174 at Eulogy northwest to FM 202. On July 28, 1955, the road was extended northeast to Brazos Point. FM 1992 was cancelled on December 23, 1959, and transferred to FM 56.

FM 1993

FM 1994

Farm to Market Road 1994 (FM 1994) is located in Fort Bend County. It runs from FM 762 at Brazos Lakes to SH 36 at Guy. The route has a brief concurrency with FM 361 in Long Point.

FM 1994 was designated on December 17, 1952, from SH 36 at Guy northeast to FM 361. On September 29, 1954, the designation was extended to FM 762, creating the concurrency with FM 361.

FM 1995

FM 1996

FM 1996 (1952)

The original FM 1996 was designated on December 17, 1952, from SH 26 east via Dolby Springs to FM 561 west of Siloam. FM 1996 was cancelled on March 15, 1958, and transferred to FM 561.

FM 1997

FM 1998

Farm to Market Road 1998 (FM 1998) is a  road that is located in Harrison County. The road begins at US 80 in downtown Marshall and turns northeast eventually ending at FM 134 east of Scottsville. FM 1998 was designated on December 17, 1952, along its current route.

Junction list

FM 1999

Notes

References

+19
Farm to market roads 1900
Farm to Market Roads 1900